Sir Robert Henry Davies,  (20 September 1824 – 23 August 1902), known as Sir Henry Davies, was a British colonial official in British India, who served as Lieutenant Governor of the Punjab.

Biography
Davies was born in 1824, the son of a Welsh physician, Sir David Davies, who was a physician to King William IV. He was educated at Charterhouse School and the East India Company College ("Haileybury"). He became a writer (clerk) in the Bengal civil service in 1844 and was an official under the East India Company and the British Raj for the rest of his career.

He served as assistant to the Commissioner of the Sutlej states, and later as settlement officer of the Lahore division. Transferring to Oudh State, he was Chief Commissioner there from 1868 until 1871 (having acted in the post 1865–66), then became Lieutenant Governor of the Punjab in 1871, serving until 1877.

Davies was created a Knight Commander of the Order of the Star of India (KCSI) in 1874, and appointed a Companion of the Order of the Indian Empire (CIE) in 1877.

After his return to the United Kingdom, he was a member of the Council of India, based in London, from 1885 until 1895, when he retired.

Davies died at Halebourne, Chobham on 23 August 1902, and is buried in the churchyard of St Mary and St Botolph, Thorney, Cambridgeshire.

Family
Davies married first Jane Elizabeth Cautley, daughter of Major General G. Cautley. After the death of his first wife, he remarried Mary France Cautley, daughter of Rev. Joshua Cautley. She died in 1879. His brother, William Henry Davies, was a first-class cricketer.

References

1824 births
1902 deaths
People educated at Charterhouse School
British colonial officials
Governors of Punjab (British India)